Cornelius Jansen, the Elder (1510, Hulst – 11 April 1576, Ghent) was a Catholic exegete and the first Bishop of Ghent. According to M.A. Screech, Jansen is considered by many to be the most outstanding Roman Catholic biblical scholar of his age.

Life
He received his early education at Ghent from the Brethren of the Common Life (called at Ghent the Hieronymites), and later studied theology and Oriental languages at Leuven. He was a good Greek scholar. After he had become a licentiate of theology in 1534, at the request of the abbot of the Premonstratensian Abbey of Tongerloo, he lectured on the Holy Scripture, to the young monks until 1542, from which date until 1562 he discharged the duties of pastor of the parish of St. Martin at Kortrijk. Having finally attained the degree of Doctor of Theology in 1562, he was immediately appointed professor of theology at the Old University of Leuven, became in the following year dean of the collegiate seminary of St. James, and attended the last sessions of the Council of Trent as delegate of the university.

On his return, Philip II of Spain appointed him first bishop of the newly founded See of Ghent, which dated only from 1559. For a long time he refused to assume the dignity, on account of the difficult conditions in the diocese, and was not preconized until 1568, by Pope Pius V. As bishop he devoted himself especially to checking the advance of Protestantism, and to carrying out the decrees of the Council of Trent. With this object in view, in 1569, he founded the Major Seminary of Ghent in the Geeraard de Duivelsteen, held diocesan synods in 1571 and 1574, and published a ritual for his diocese. He was entrusted with the compilation of a ritual to be used in the ecclesiastical province of Mechlin, but did not finish it.

Works
While at Tongerloo he wrote a great deal, and, as pastor at Kortrijk, had already become widely known for his exegetical work.

Among Jansen's writings is the Concordia evangelica (Leuven, 1529), to which he later added the "Commentarius in Concordiam et totem historiam evangelicam" (Leuven, 1572), undoubtedly his best work. The Concordia Evangelica was epoch-making in the history of Catholic exegesis, for Jansen insisted on the literal interpretation, as against the mystical interpretation of his predecessors, emphasized also the importance of the original text, and of a profound study of Oriental languages as aids to a full comprehension of the Latin Vulgate.

He published also: "Commentarius in Proverbia Salomonis" (Leuven, 1567), and "Commentarius in Ecclesiasticum" (Leuven, 1569), both of which were republished in one work at Antwerp in 1589; "Commentarius in omnes Psalmos Davidicos" (Leuven, 1569), with an introduction to each psalm, an excellent paraphrase of the text, and explanations of the difficult passages; "Paraphrases in ea Veteris Testamenti Cantica, quae per ferias singulas totius anni usus ecclesiasticus observat" (Leuven, 1569). After his death appeared "Annotationes in Librum Sapientiae" (Leuven, 1577).

References

1510 births
1576 deaths
16th-century Roman Catholic bishops in the Holy Roman Empire
Bishops of Ghent
Belgian biblical scholars
16th-century Dutch Roman Catholic theologians
Participants in the Council of Trent
People from Hulst
Old University of Leuven alumni
Academic staff of the Old University of Leuven